= Zorawar Singh (jump-rope athlete) =

Jump Rope Athlete

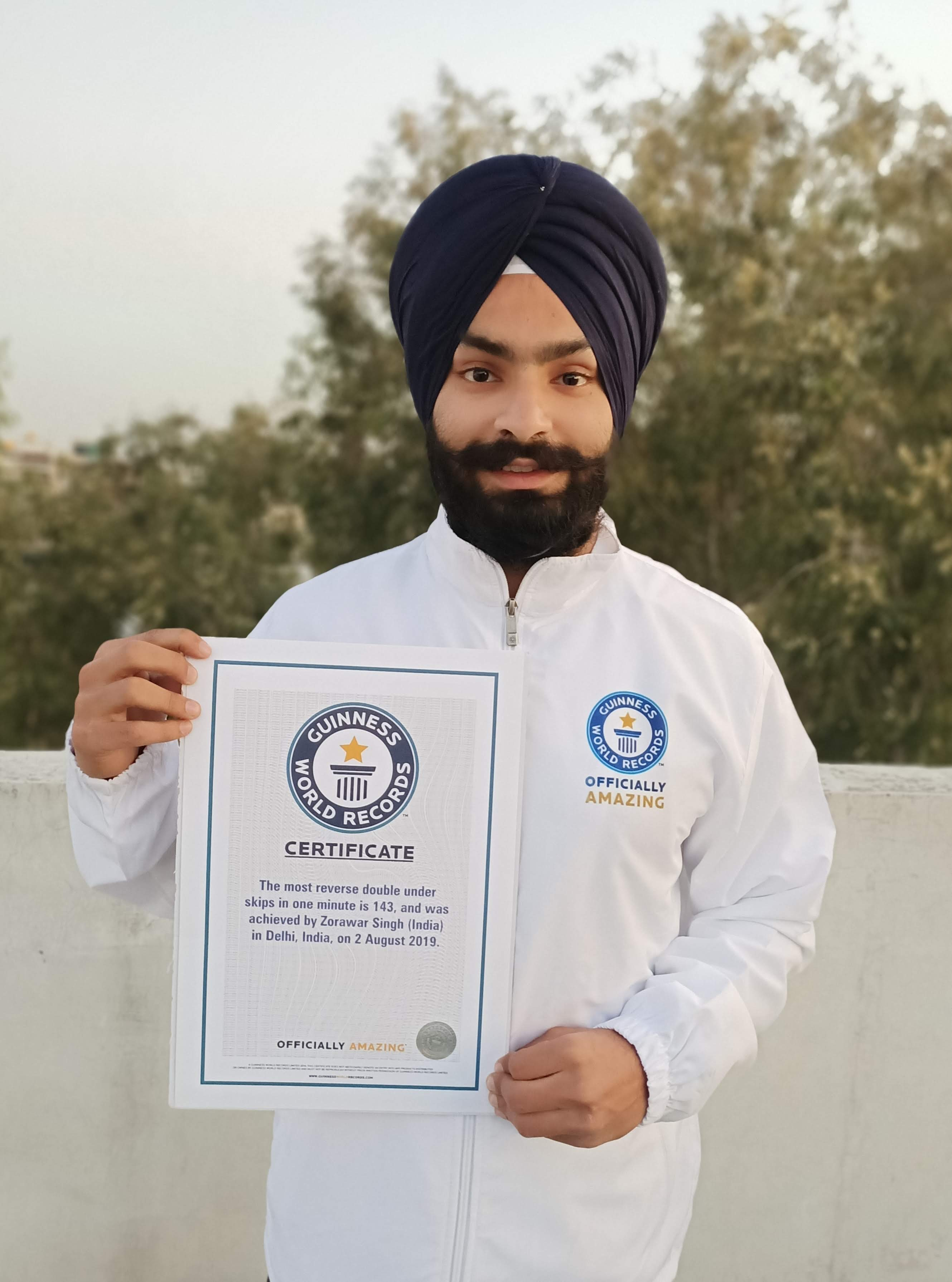
- Born: 24 August 1999 (age 26); Delhi
- Education: I.G.I.P.E.S.S.(Delhi University)
- Known for: Jump Rope Skipping World Record, Pyramid Wheel Freestyle Jump Rope
- Height: 171 cm (5 ft 7 in)
- Awards: 17 Guinness World Records

Zorawar Singh is an Indian jump-rope athlete from New Delhi. He is the Guinness World Record holder for the most jumps on roller skates. He is the winner of several national & South Asian championships. In 2016, Zorawar competed in the World Jump Rope Championship in Portugal, where he came in 4th place.

== World records ==
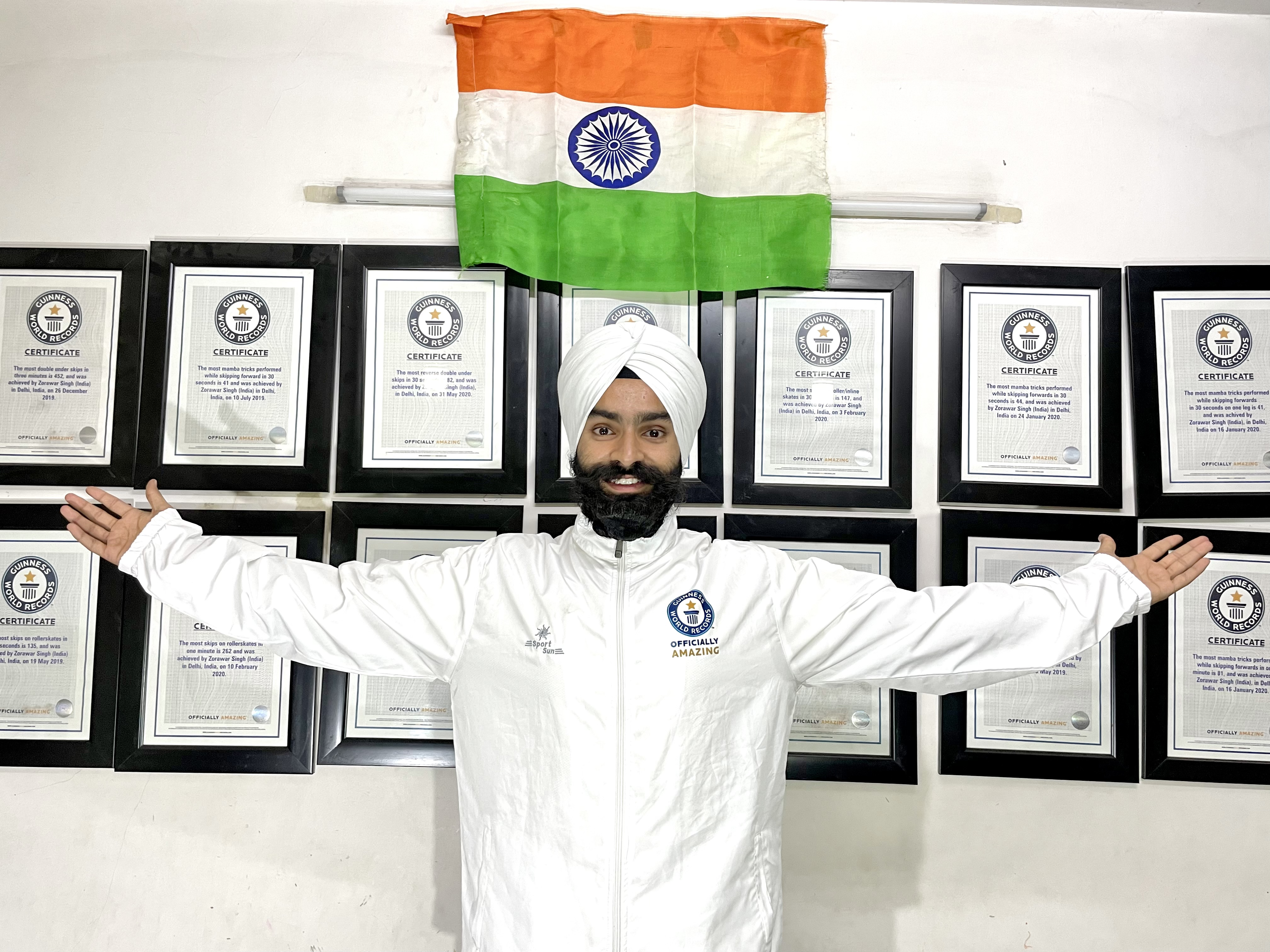

On 24 January 2020, Zorawar created a Guinness World Record by performing 147 skips in 30 seconds while wearing the roller skates. The Guinness World Record uploaded the video of his performance on their Instagram page.

Zorawar holds several other Guinness World Records in the jump-rope category including the most double under frogs in 30 seconds, most mamba tricks performed while skipping forward in one minute, most reverse double under skips in 30 seconds, etc.

== Pyramid Wheel Freestyle Jump Rope ==
In September 2020, Zorawar came into the news for performing ‘pyramid Wheel Freestyle Jump Rope’ with 3 of his friends. Zorawar has participated in several Indian talent hunt shows such as ‘India’s Got Talent’ and ‘OMG! Yeh Mera India’.
